Mattakandathil Dineshan Nidheesh (born 5 May 1991) is an Indian cricketer who represents Kerala in domestic cricket. He is a right-handed batsman and right-arm medium-fast bowler.

Domestic career
Nidheesh made his first class debut for Kerala in the 2015–16 Ranji Trophy on 21 January 2015 against Tripura. He took 14 wickets from the six matches he played in the  2017-18 Ranji Trophy becoming Kerala's fourth highest wicket taker in the season.  

He made his List A debut for Kerala in the 2017–18 Vijay Hazare Trophy on 11 February 2018 against Tripura.

In August 2018, he was one of eight players that were fined by the Kerala Cricket Association, after showing dissent against Kerala's captain, Sachin Baby.

His maiden 5-wicket haul (6 for 88) came against Himachal Pradesh on the 2018-19 Ranji Trophy. His career best performance (7 for 88) to date was against Punjab on the 2019-20 Ranji Trophy.

He made his Twenty20 debut for Kerala in the 2018–19 Syed Mushtaq Ali Trophy on 21 February 2019 against Manipur.

He took his maiden five-wicket haul in List A during the 2021-22 Vijay Hazare Trophy against Maharashtra. He was Kerala's highest wicket-taker in the season with 11 wickets from six matches.

Indian Premier League
Nidheesh had earlier attended a trial camp of Kochi Tuskers Kerala but he failed to get a contract. Following an  impressive 2017-18 Ranji Trophy season he was bought by the Mumbai Indians for 20 lakhs INR in the 2018 IPL auction.

References

External links
 

1991 births
Living people
Indian cricketers
Kerala cricketers
Sportspeople from Kottayam
Cricketers from Kerala